The men's C-2 500 metres event was an open-style, pairs canoeing event conducted as part of the Canoeing at the 1976 Summer Olympics program. This event made its debut at these games.

Medalists

Results

Heats
The 15 teams first raced in two heats on July 28. The top three finishers from each of the heats advanced directly to the semifinals and the remaining nine teams were relegated to the repechages.

Repechages
Taking place on July 28, the top three finishers from each of the repechages advanced to the semifinals.

Japan's reason for disqualification was not disclosed in the official report.

Semifinals
Three semifinals were held on July 30. The top three finishers from each of the semifinals advanced to the final.

Final
The final was held on July 30.

References
1976 Summer Olympics official report Volume 3. p. 179. 
Sports-reference.com 1976 C-2 500 m results.

Men's C-2 500
Men's events at the 1976 Summer Olympics